Thomas Noel, 2nd Viscount Wentworth (18 November 1745 – 17 April 1815) was a British politician who succeeded to a peerage before he could take his seat in the House of Commons, having just been elected in 1774.

Early life
Wentworth was the only son of Edward Noel, 1st Viscount Wentworth and his wife, Judith Lamb, daughter of William Lamb of Wellesborough, Leicestershire. His sister, the Hon. Judith Noel, married Sir Ralph Milbanke, 6th Baronet.

He was educated at Eton and, having matriculated at Brasenose College, Oxford on 4 November 1763, was awarded MA on 29 April 1766.

Career
At the 1774 general election, Noel successfully contested Leicestershire and was returned as Member of Parliament. However, he had to leave the Commons within a month when he succeeded to the peerage on the death of his father on 31 October.

Personal life
On 2 February 1788, Wentworth married Mary Ligonier, Dowager Countess Ligonier, a daughter of Robert Henley, 1st Earl of Northington and widow of Edward Ligonier, 1st Earl Ligonier (of the second creation). The union did not produce any children, although Wentworth had fathered an illegitimate son, Thomas Noel (1774–1853), who became rector of Kirkby Mallory. There he conducted the marriage ceremony of his cousin, Anne Isabella Milbanke, to Lord Byron in 1815.

Upon his death in 1815 aged 69, Lord Wentworth's viscountcy became extinct, whilst the barony of Wentworth became abeyant between his nephew Hon. Nathaniel Curzon (later Lord Curzon) and his sister, Judith (and after her, her daughter Anne Isabella Byron, Baroness Byron). When Judith died in 1822 and then Lord Curzon died without heirs in 1856, the abeyance was terminated in favour of Anne.

References

Thomas
1745 births
1815 deaths
Alumni of Brasenose College, Oxford
10
British MPs 1774–1780
Noel, Thomas
People educated at Eton College